Qayqalu (also Romanized as Qāyqalū; also known as Ghow Ghlū Gūr-e Sefīd, Qūghlū Pā’īn, Qūqlī, Qūqlū, and Qūqlū Gar-e Sefīd) is a village in Mahur Rural District, Mahvarmilani District, Mamasani County, Fars Province, Iran. At the 2006 census, its population was 41, in 8 families.

References 

Populated places in Mamasani County